James Jones (June 2, 1930 – August 2, 2012) was an American singer-songwriter who moved to New York City while a teenager. According to Allmusic journalist Steve Huey, "best known for his 1960 R&B smash 'Handy Man', Jones sang in a smooth yet soulful falsetto modeled on the likes of Clyde McPhatter and Sam Cooke."

Career
Jones was born in Birmingham, Alabama. His first job in the entertainment industry was as a tap dancer. He joined a doo-wop group named the Berliners in 1954. They later changed their name to Sparks of Rhythm. In 1955 Jones co-wrote "Handy Man", which was recorded by the Sparks of Rhythm in 1956 (after Jones left the group). After recording with other groups, Jones went solo and, in 1959, teamed up with Otis Blackwell who reworked "Handy Man" which Jones recorded on the MGM subsidiary Cub Records. When the flute player did not show up for the session, Blackwell famously whistled on the recording. "Handy Man", released in 1959, gave Jones his first US and UK hit single. It went to No. 2 on the Billboard Hot 100 in 1960, and peaked at No. 3 in the UK Singles Chart. It introduced a rock falsetto singing style to the British audience and later scored hits for Del Shannon and James Taylor. A few months later in 1960, Jones' recording of "Good Timin'" climbed to No. 1 in the UK and No. 3 in the US. Both "Handy Man" and "Good Timin'" were million sellers, earning Jones two gold discs.

Although Jones had only the two million-selling Top 40 hits, he nevertheless kept active in the music industry]as both a songwriter and recording artist and made personal appearances as he saw fit. Jones' subsequent career was low key, although it included three more UK chart entries in the following 12 months. Jones remained with Cub until 1962, and then recorded for the next decade for a variety of labels, including Bell, Parkway, Roulette, and Vee-Jay.

Del Shannon cited Jones and Bill Kenny as influences on his falsetto style. Later singers who used falsetto included Frankie Valli of the Four Seasons, Lou Christie, Robert John, Jimmy Somerville, and Barry Gibb. Gibb cited Shannon, in turn, as an influence for his disco vocalizations with the Bee Gees. Jones released Grandma's Rock & Roll Party in the 1990s on CD, perhaps, in part due to his popularity in the UK Northern soul circles. It included new versions of "Handy Man" and "Good Timin'". Castle/Sanctuary released a double album titled Good Timin': The Anthology in 2002.

Death
Jones died in Aberdeen, North Carolina on August 2, 2012. He was 82.

Discography

Singles

References

External links

1930 births
2012 deaths
American male pop singers
American soul musicians
American tap dancers
Songwriters from Alabama
Musicians from Birmingham, Alabama
MGM Records artists
Cub Records artists
Vee-Jay Records artists
Bell Records artists
African-American male songwriters
20th-century African-American male singers